Xin Detao (born 1991) is a Chinese ski mountaineer, and member of the national selection of the People's Republic of China.

Selected results 
 2009:
 1st, Asian Championship, vertical race
 2nd, Asian Championship, relay (mixed teams), together with Huang Chunsen, Jin Yubo and Cui Xiaodi

References 

1991 births
Living people
Chinese male ski mountaineers